Shahar Tuchner (born 27 January 1987) is an Israeli artist who works primarily in video, sculpture, painting and installations.

Biography
Tuchner was born in 1987 in Israel and grew up in Herzliya. He attended art studies at Beit Berl College and graduated at HaMidrasha School of Art by Beit Berl in 2010. He also graduated visual communication studies at the Open University in 2011.

Tuchner's works mainly deal with social issues, consumerism, multiculturalism and also with different aspects of food. Examples of works that are revolving around the food theme are "Seeded Floor" or "Kiss Me Popcorn". The style of his works is influenced by the pop art movement, and they are often characterized by the use of humor. Tuchner states that he works “in a freestyle manner and the technique… [used] for each work is determined in the process of creation, often altered and adapted to best suit the idea behind the piece".

His works were displayed in solo exhibitions in various art spaces, such as Janco-Dada Museum, CSPS Legion Arts in Iowa, Koresh Gallery in Jerusalem, and more. In 2017 he won the Juror's Choice at The Biennial Project as part of Venice Biennale. His works are displayed in permanent collections such as those of Yad Vashem museum, Queen Mary University of London, Janco-Dada Museum and Royal College of Art in London.

Solo exhibitions
 2020: “Chorona Days”, Janco-Dada Museum, Ein Hod, Israel, Curator: Raya Zommer Tal
 2020: “The Invisible Enemy”, Videokanava Workgroup, Tampere, Finland, Curator: Veera Salmio
 2020: “The Invisible Enemy”, CSPS Legion Arts, Cedar Rapids, Iowa, United States
 2019: “YUMMY”, Pineapple Black Contemporary art space, Middlesbrough, United Kingdom
 2017: ”Ish Tabach Shmo”, Koresh 14 Gallery, Jerusalem, Israel

Group exhibitions
Partial list of participated group exhibitions:
 2021: “The World of Light”, Artweek Auckland 2021, Auckland University of Technology, Auckland, New Zealand
 2021: "Performative Mundane Acts of the Everyday", Defibrillator Gallery, Zhou B Art Center, Bridgeport, Chicago, United States
 2021: "The Ostranenie Theatre Moving Image", The Plough / Farnham / Surrey / Plymouth, United Kingdom
 2021: "Bread and Roses 15" Artists’ Studios Gallery, Tel Aviv, Israel
 2020: "WHY?", Cultivate & Organ, London, United Kingdom
 2020: "Cine-Sisters SW Short Film", Downhill Blue, Plymouth Arts Cinema, Devon
 2019: "Videokanava’s FEM4 Contemporary Art Exhibition and World of Tango Festival Milongas" No. 13, Tampere, Finland
 2019: "Body", Thought Foundation, Gateshead, United Kingdom
 2019: "This Is a Love Song", University of Haifa Arts Center, Haifa, Israel
 2018: "Aesthetica Art Prize Exhibition", York Art Gallery, York, United Kingdom
 2018: "Middle class", The Israeli Art Gallery, Oranim Academic College, Kiryat Tivon, Israel
 2018: "Soup", Caraboo Projects Gallery, Bedminster, Bristol, United Kingdom
 2018: "Musrara Mix Festival", Breathturn, Jerusalem, Israel
 2018: "Video Art Film Club", Leyden Gallery, London, United Kingdom
 2017: The Biennial Project, Venice Biennale 57th, Venice, Italy
 2017: "Migrations", a short film festival, by The Front, New Orleans, Louisiana, United States
 2017: "This is Dance Festival", University of Roehampton, London, United Kingdom
 2017: "New York Art Week Show 2017", Caelum Gallery, New York, NY, USA
 2016: "Secret Art 8", Mani House, Tel Aviv, Israel
 2016: "DADA 100", Janco-Dada Museum, Ein Hod Artists’ Village, Israel
 2016: "Sole Luna", traveling doc film festival, Palermo, Milan and Treviso, Italy
 2016: "The 6th Arts Festival", Association Stéla, Saint-Etienne, France
 2016: "The International Video Dance Festival of Burgundy", Le Creusot, France
 2016: "Fresh Paint 8", The Artbit Booth, in collaboration with Slideluck, Yarid Hamizrach, Tel Aviv
 2016: "Boom Bang II", traveling video art exhibition, Nectar Gallery, Tbilisi, Georgia
 2016: "CeC – Carnival of E-Creativity", 10 Years of CologneOFF, Shillong, India
 2015: "Videonomad", Koganei Art Spot Chateau, Tokyo, Japan
 2015: "Proyector 2015";, video art festival, Espacio Proa, Madrid, Spain
 2015: "Call for Bushwick", 98 Moore Street, Brooklyn, New York, United States
 2015: "Boom Bang II", traveling exhibition, NN Contemporary Art, Northampton, United Kingdom and Zagare Lithuania Capital of Culture 2015 Festival, Zagare, Lithuania
 2015: "The Open West", The Wilson, Cheltenham Art Gallery and Museum, Cheltenham, United Kingdom
 2015: "Seeded Floor", On the Ground Floor Gallery, Los Angeles, California, United States
 2015: "Wish You Were Here 14", A.I.R. Gallery, Brooklyn, NY, USA
 2014: "Two Minute Film Festival", Carnegie Museum of Art, Pittsburgh, Pennsylvania, United States
 2014: "Green Fest", video art festival;, Environment Improvement Centre, Belgrade, Serbia
 2014: "The Feast", traveling exhibition, Benyamini Center, Tel Aviv, and The Water Tower Art Gallery, Nahariya, Israel
 2014: "Slideluck Tel Aviv III", Alfred Gallery, Tel Aviv, Israel
 2014: "Artists for the Library at Lewinsky Park", P8 Gallery, Tel Aviv, Israel
 2014: "Paper Whispers", Muza Plus Gallery, Tel Aviv, Israel
 2013: "Film Nights", 5th Base Gallery, London, United Kingdom
 2013: "Videocracy", The CCA Center for Contemporary Art, Tel Aviv, Israel
 2013: "BYOB", Contemporary by Golconda Gallery, Tel Aviv, Israel,
 2011: "The Emerging Art Fair", Preview Berlin Festival, Berlin, Germany
 2011: "Two Minute Film Festival", Carnegie Museum of Art, Pittsburgh, Pennsylvania, United States
 2011: "Bridges", Tavi Gallery in collaboration with Inbal Center, Tel Aviv, Israel
 2011: "Heroes 2", Hanina Gallery, Tel Aviv, Israel

Collections 

 Yad Vashem Museum, Jerusalem, Israel
 Queen Mary University of London
 Zhou B Art Center, Bridgeport, Chicago, United States
 Janco-Dada Museum, Ein Hod, Israel
 Royal College of Art, London, United Kingdom
 CSPS Legion Arts, Iowa, United States
 The MASS collection, base UK
 Danses Macabres Collection, Lyon, France

Awards 
 2017: Jurors' Choice, The Biennial Project in Venice Biennale 57th, Venice, Italy
 2014: Winner of the 18–27 Age Category, “Green Fest”, Belgrade, Serbia
 2014: Third Place Audience Choice Award, “Two Minute Film Festival”, Carnegie Museum of Art, Pittsburgh, Pennsylvania, United States

Further reading 
 "Art Reveal Magazine", Germany, a personal interview‏‏‏‏‏ by Anne Grahm – ARM Team, 2021
 "FILLER Zin", Issue 04: "FOOD & LOVE", Greater Manchester, United Kingdom, editor: Holly Eliza Temple, 2020
 “Itchy Spaghetti Zine”, Issue 11: BODIES, Sheffield, South Yorkshire, United Kingdom, editor: Lucy Lound, 2020
 “Cooltzine #2 Shared Space”, published by Cooltsalon, Stour Space, London, United Kingdom, 2019
 “Aesthetica Art Prize Anthology”, York, United Kingdom, 2018
 “Peripheral ARTeries Art Review”, a personal interview, by Josh Ryder, Melissa C. Hilborn and Barbara Scott, 2017
 “An Artist Cookbook”, by Rudy Kanhye, Glasgow, Scotland, United Kingdom, 2017
 “Af”, urban magazine, issue 49 – “Zombies”, 19 June 2016, page 16
 “Art Yellow Book #1”, CICA Museum, Gimpo, South Korea, 2015

References

External links 

Publications, shahar-tuchner-art
Shahar Tuchner, ArtFacts profile
 
 
 

Israeli video artists
Israeli artists
Living people
1987 births